York Street is a street in Dublin in the Republic of Ireland that runs between Aungier Street in the west and St Stephen's Green in the east.

History 

It appears on the map around 1685, named after Prince James, Duke of York (later King James II). M'Cready states the street is named after the brother of George I, Ernest Augustus, Duke of York and Albany. The home of the Royal College of Surgeons in Ireland (RCSI) is at the eastern end on the corner with St Stephen's Green and the RCSI's medical education building is at 26 York Street. Solomon Richards, four times president of the RCSI, was born there around 1760.

There was a Salvation Army Hostel which previously was a Congregational Church or Independent Church which was ministered by the Rev. Dr. William Urwick for 40 years, was on the street.

References

External links 

Streets in Dublin (city)
St Stephen's Green